Williams is a city in Coconino County, Arizona, United States, located west of Flagstaff. Its population was 3,023 at the 2010 census. It lies on the routes of Historic Route 66 and Interstate 40. It is also the southern terminus of the Grand Canyon Railway, which takes visitors to Grand Canyon Village.  There are numerous inns, motels, restaurants and gas stations catering to the large influx of tourists rather than local residents, especially during the summer and holiday seasons.

Also known as the "Gateway to the Grand Canyon", Williams was the last city on Historic Route 66 to be bypassed by Interstate 40. The community, bypassed on October 13, 1984, continues to thrive on tourism. Boasting seven fishing lakes in the area, hiking trails up Bill Williams Mountain and into Sycamore Canyon, an alpine ski area and cross country ski trails, four-seasons weather and an abundance of wildlife, Williams offers unlimited recreational opportunities for the outdoor enthusiast.

The Historic Downtown District covers six square blocks. Williams boasts a rich heritage that features the Old West and Route 66, coupled with tourism trends today and the city's heyday years of the '50s and '60s.

History

Founded in 1881, Williams was named for William Sherley "Old Bill" Williams (1787–1849), a famous trapper, trader, scout and mountain man, who often trapped in the area. A statue of "Old Bill" stands in Monument Park, located on the west side of the city. The large mountain directly to the south is named Bill Williams Mountain. The city was incorporated on July 9, 1901.

Williams was the last city whose section of Route 66 was bypassed, due to lawsuits that kept the last section of Interstate 40 in Arizona from being built around the city.  After settlements called for the state to build three Williams exits, the suits were dropped and I-40 was completed.  On October 13, 1984, Interstate 40 was opened around the town and newspapers the next day reported the essential end of US 66.  The following year, Route 66 was decommissioned.

The Williams Historic Business District and Urban Route 66, Williams were added to the National Register of Historic Places in 1984 and 1989, respectively.

Demographics

As of the census of 2000, there were 2,842 people, 1,057 households, and 733 families residing in the city. The racial makeup of the city was 77.1% White, 2.9% Black or African American, 1.7% Native American, 1.3% Asian, <0.1% Pacific Islander, 14.2% from other races, and 2.7% from two or more races.  32.3% of the population were Hispanic or Latino of any race.

There were 1,057 households, out of which 36.2% had children under the age of 18 living with them, 51.1% were married couples living together, 13.3% had a female householder with no husband present, and 30.6% were non-families. 26.6% of all households were made up of individuals, and 11.4% had someone living alone who was 65 years of age or older.  The average household size was 2.69 and the average family size was 3.24.

In the city, the age distribution of the population shows 29.8% under the age of 18, 8.6% from 18 to 24, 28.3% from 25 to 44, 22.2% from 45 to 64, and 11.1% who were 65 years of age or older.  The median age was 35 years. For every 100 females, there were 103.4 males.  For every 100 females age 18 and over, there were 96.4 males.

The median income for a household in the city was $32,455, and the median income for a family was $39,063. Males had a median income of $27,237 versus $25,162 for females. The per capita income for the city was $16,223.  About 9.9% of families and 12.8% of the population were below the poverty line, including 18.2% of those under age 18 and 11.6% of those age 65 or over.

Geography
Bill Williams Mountain rises to an elevation of  just south of Williams.

Climate
On average in Williams, December is the coldest month, July is the warmest month, and August is the wettest month.

Government

The City of Williams has adopted the Council-Manager form of government. The Williams City Council is the city's legislative body. The seven-member council oversee the operations of the city government and sets policy by approving programs, appropriating funds, enacting laws and appointing the City Manager and other officers such as the City Attorney, City Clerk and City Magistrate. Williams' Mayor and City Council are elected at large. The Mayor serves a two-year term and Council members serve overlapping four-year terms. John Moore is the current Mayor of Williams, having first been elected in 2008. Before being elected as Mayor, Moore was a former Williams police chief and had been on Williams City Council for four years before being elected Mayor.

The City Manager is appointed by, and serves at the pleasure of, the City Council and is responsible for overseeing the daily operations of the city. The role of the City Manager is to execute the policies and programs established by the City Council and to provide administrative leadership and management of municipal operations.

Federally, Williams is part of Arizona's 2nd congressional district.  Most recently it was represented by Republican Rick Renzi from 2003 to 2009, Democrat Ann Kirkpatrick following the 2008 election, Republican Paul Gosar following the 2010 election, again by Ann Kirkpatrick following the 2012 and 2014 elections, and since 2017 by Democrat Tom O'Halleran.

Education
Williams is served by the Williams Unified School District. Two schools, Williams Elementary Middle School, and Williams High School, serve the city. A charter school, Heritage Elementary Charter School, also provides services.

Parks and recreation
The city of Williams Parks and Recreation Department operates several parks and public facilities throughout the city. Recreation Center & Skate Park is centered around youth activities and entertainment and features an indoor skate park called the "Shed". The city hosts a public swimming pool located at the Williams Aquatic Center, an indoor facility offering seasonal and recreational swimming activities. The pool is open the Saturday before Memorial Day and closes the Saturday before Labor Day every year. Cureton Park offers softball, baseball and basketball courts, picnic area and public restrooms. Buckskinner Park has a basketball and volleyball court and a lake that is stocked regularly by the Arizona Game and Fish Department and features a trail head to several trails maintained by the United States Forest Service. Cataract Lake County Park is a joint venture between Coconino County and the City of Williams and includes several barbecue pits, a playground and public restroom facilities including a lake stocked regularly by the Arizona Game and Fish Department. Dogtown Reservoir and its recreational facilities are nearby. The city also maintains a rodeo facility that hosts the annual Williams Reunion Rodeo.

Transportation

Passengers were shuttled from the station to downtown Williams by Amtrak Thruway Motorcoach. Following the closure of Williams Junction in 2018, Amtrak introduced a new Thruway bus service between Williams and Flagstaff.

The surviving downtown station serves as the southern terminus for the Grand Canyon Railway.

Williams has a small general aviation airport, H.A. Clark Memorial Field, serving small aircraft.

Arts and culture
Williams has a vibrant arts and cultural events schedule that runs year round. Starting in December and running through January, The Polar Express operated by the Grand Canyon Railway is a train ride based on the popular children's book The Polar Express written by Chris Van Allsburg. The city also hosts the Historic Route 66 Car Show featuring automobiles from Route 66's heyday. During the summer months The Cataract Creek Gang acts out a gun fight every night in the streets of Williams. This cast of Old West characters also tend to "rob" the Grand Canyon Railway train upon its return from the canyon.

Films
A few Hollywood films with A-list actors and actresses have been shot in and around the town of Williams and the surrounding area.
 Guns of the Timberland (1960), starring Alan Ladd, Frankie Avalon and Jeanne Crain
 Midnight Run (1988), starring Robert De Niro and Charles Grodin
 Speechless (1994), starring Michael Keaton, Geena Davis and Christopher Reeve

Tourism
The majority of economic activity for Williams is derived from tourism. Williams is approximately a one-hour, sixty mile car drive from the South Entrance of the Grand Canyon, and forty-two miles west of the City of Flagstaff via the Interstate 40. Other notable Williams attractions include Bearizona Wildlife Park, the Grand Canyon Railway & Hotel, Grand Canyon Deer Farm, Pete's Route 66 Gas Station Museum, and the Planes of Fame Air Museum.

Notable people
 Billy Hatcher, baseball player and coach
 Ross Hagen, voice actor, director, screenwriter and producer
 Diana Gabaldon, writer and actress known for the Outlander Series novels and Outlander TV series
 Tom Ray, animator for Warner Brothers cartoons
 Old Bill Williams, namesake of the town
 John W. Moore, Mayor of Williams, Arizona- 2008–2022, Arizona Congressional District 2 Republican candidate, 2022 United States House of Representatives elections

See also

 Keyhole Sink
 Kaibab Lake
 Dogtown Lake

References

External links

 City of Williams
 Williams Chamber of Commerce

 
Cities in Coconino County, Arizona
Cities in Arizona